Jacques Berthomeau (1948-2022) was a wine consultant commissioned by the French Ministry of Agriculture to prepare a report in 2001, now known as The Berthomeau  Report, to "establish the goals and means to be deployed in terms of people, regulations and finance for a winning strategy for French wine as we approach the year 2010". Berthomeau headed a committee that called for French winemakers to meet the globalization of wine by adapting to new market demands, similar to those called for in Plan Bordeaux. The Berthomeau Report, like Plan Bordeaux, has met considerable organized opposition.
Jacques Berthomeau was the co-founder of the Les5duVin wine site. He died on Sunday 6 November 2022.

See also
Bordeaux wine
Wine lake
List of wine personalities

References

External links
Wine war: Savvy New World marketers are devastating the French wine industry

Living people
French civil servants
1948 births